Acricoactis is a genus of sea anemones of the family Acricoactinidae. It currently includes only one species.

Species 
The following species are recognized:

Distribution
This species was described from Alaska.

References 

Acricoactinidae
Hexacorallia genera